is a Japanese manga series by Aloha Higa. It revolves around the everyday lives of a group of animals mingling with humans at a café run by a polar bear. An anime adaptation by Studio Pierrot aired in Japan between April 2012 and March 2013. It was streamed as it aired on Japanese TV on Crunchyroll as Polar Bear Cafe for global audiences.

Characters

A polar bear who runs Polar Bear's Café, which serves organic foods and drinks and is popular with both humans and animals. He has a habit of making bad puns with his customers and friends, just for the amusement of hearing their retorts. He was born in Hudson Bay, Canada.

A lazy, somewhat dimwitted, and kind-hearted giant panda who works part-time at a zoo. He enjoys lazing around and eating bamboo and only orders iced coffee at the café until Polar Bear adds bamboo to the menu only for his sake. He is obsessed with all panda products and has a tendency to point out his popularity at the zoo and his own cuteness.

An  and a frequent customer of the café and friend of Polar Bear who generally orders a cafe mocha. He generally serves as the tsukkomi to the antics of Polar Bear and Panda. He has a crush on another penguin named Penko, and eventually upon learning that Penko has six identical sisters, he ends up dating them all. However, Penguin's inability to get their names right sets off a chain of events that lead to them dumping him.

A grizzly bear who is a childhood friend of Polar Bear. He runs a bar in the middle of town called "BAR THE GRIZZLY" and has a rather fierce personality, though occasionally shows a soft side. He also usually serves as the tsukkomi to the antics of Polar Bear and Panda just like Penguin, a feature that curiously brought them to the point of becoming good friends. He hibernates during the winter but is constantly being woken up from his slumber by Polar Bear.

Panda and Mei Mei's mother who usually reprimands her son when he gets too lazy by threatening to suck him into her vacuum cleaner.

A human girl who works at the Polar Bear's Cafe. She used to live in the same town as Llama and her hobby is to take rides on her bicycle. Although not fond of scary stories, she's great at telling them, even making Mr. Handa faint of hearing it.

The panda caretaker at the zoo Panda works at. Although he is quite popular with the animals at the zoo, he doesn't have as much luck getting the attention of women. He has a crush on Sasako. Also, he's really good at being scared, according to Penguin.

A llama who likes grass and dreams of becoming a popular animal at the zoo just like Panda. He is often noted for his maturity.

A three-toed sloth who lives in the café's outskirts. True to his character, he has a very slow pace and speech.

An older giant panda who, until episode 44, worked full time at the zoo alongside Panda, not including his part-time job as a tissue-pack distributor. He is married and father of five, working hard to make ends meet for his family. He has since been transferred to a zoo in Singapore.

A female penguin who works at a bakery near the Polar Bear's Cafe and Penguin's love interest. However, when Penguin finally confesses, it turns out that Penko is only one among seven identical sisters taking shifts at the bakery. Somehow Penguin started dating all seven at once, although he has a hard time dealing with them as he is unable to differentiate each one from the others, but when the girls make an ultimatum for Penguin to choose one among them, they realize that none of his traits are particularly interesting and dump him.

A Galapagos tortoise who is a regular at the cafe. Has a very slow speech and pace.

Panda's little sister with a crush on Handa, whom she deems as handsome as a prince due to his short and chubby panda-like figure. She doesn't prefer Mr. Rintarou, despite his love for pandas, because she claims he is too skinny for her type.

A red panda who usually looks up to Panda despite being far more capable and reliable than him.

Three penguins each representing a member of the genus Pygoscelis who come with a plan to have people learn the differences between the different species of penguins by developing a deck of penguin-related cards. The cards don't sell very well, but the penguins find more success with South Pole Squad: Penguinger, an action play at the zoo.

A mandrill who works at the zoo and visits the café.

A tamandua who works at the zoo and occasionally visits the café.

A japanese badger that applies for the part time job at Polar Bear's Café but was rejected. In the anime he complains of his living arrangements, as he cannot burrow in his wooden floored apartment.

A tree-kangaroo, coffee specialist, and owner of  who provides coffee beans to Polar Bear's Café.

A group of red squirrels who work at Tree-Climbing Coffee by selecting the coffee beans Tree Kangaroo roasts.

Three tenants of Grizzly's Bar who are huge fans of Polar Bear from the time he was a rapper known as "MC 469MA" ("469MA" is read as "Shirokuma").

A black caiman who is a regular customer at Grizzly's Bar The Grizzly. When he first sees Panda, he calls him delicious before being spurned by Grizzly.

A king penguin who gets really upset when it is confused with Emperor Penguins, like Penguin, and a good friend of Panda-Mama. King Penguin's gender is left ambiguous (voice actor Hiyama is a man), but it uses the feminine personal pronoun  to refer to itself, a trait shared with Panda Mama and Red Squirrel Mama.

An emperor penguin chick who is Penguin's nephew. He often plays train with King Chick.

A king penguin chick who is King Penguin's son. The fact that king penguin chicks do not look as cute as emperor penguin chicks is a running gag.

Grizzly's mother. When remembering her, Grizzly says that she was very scary when she was angry.

A popular animal working at the zoo who while at the cafe complains that smashing shells on rocks is hard work.

Another worker at the zoo whom everyone believes eats dreams because of the Baku myth.

A flower shop owner who is nicknamed  and is incredibly fond of Panda (and pandas in general). Although he is considered attractive by many female customers, Panda seems to not be interested in him. His intense love for pandas annoyed one school girl once.

One of the workers at the zoo Panda works at. He works under Handa.

A visitor of the café who becomes so moved by the taste of its black coffee that he decides to study under a tree kangaroo to learn how to roast coffee beans.

Media

Manga
The original manga by Aloha Higa began serialisation in Shogakukan's Flowers magazine from 2006. Five tankōbon volumes have been released. The manga went on hiatus between May and July 2012, citing lack of communication concerning the anime adaptation.
The manga returned from hiatus in the September 2012 issue of Flowers, following Higa managing to talk with the anime production on her intellectual property. The manga was retitled Shirokuma Cafe Today's Special and moved to Shueisha's Cocohana on its September 2014. The manga is licensed in North America by Seven Seas Entertainment.

Anime

An anime adaptation by Studio Pierrot aired in Japan on TV Tokyo between April 5, 2012 and March 28, 2013 and was simulcast by Crunchyroll.

Reception
In 2019, Polygon named the anime series as one of the best anime of the 2010s.

References

External links
Official anime website 

2012 anime television series debuts
Animated television series about bears
Animated television series about penguins
Comedy anime and manga
Fictional coffeehouses and cafés
Fictional polar bears
Josei manga
Pierrot (company)
Seven Seas Entertainment titles
Shogakukan manga
Shueisha franchises
Shueisha manga
Television series about pandas
TV Tokyo original programming